Thabani Mthembu (born 17 July 1994) is a South African professional footballer who last played for TS Sporting as a striker.

Club career
Mthembu began his youth career playing for local sides Fast Movers and Mvuzane Blue Aces prior to joining the Kaizer Chiefs academy. He only spent one year at Chiefs before he was suspended for suspected age cheating.

He then moved to Vodacom League side Young Mates FC before joining Platinum Stars on a three-year deal in June 2012 after impressing in the 2012 Cape Town International Challenge. He made his debut for Dikwena on 27 October 2012 in a 4–0 over Free State Stars at Royal Bafokeng Stadium, coming on, in the 85th minute. In Mthembu's two seasons at Stars, Mthembu played 19 league games but did not score any goals and he was not in the match day squads when Stars won the MTN8 and Telkom Knockout.

He joined Supersport United in July 2014, as a free agent as his contract was not renewed, after he went for trials. During his trials he scored against cross-town rivals Mamelodi Sundowns in the Gauteng Cup. He made his league debut for Matsatsantsa on 9 August 2014 in a 1–0 loss to Bidvest Wits, coming in as a substitute and played 18 minutes. He was sent on loan to Vasco da Gama.

International career
Mthembu has played for the South African under-20 team and was the top scorer with 5 goals at the 2012 Cape Town International Challenge.

He was part of the South Africa squad for the 2013 COSAFA Cup and made his senior debut against Zambia on his 19th birthday. He was capped twice.

References

1994 births
Living people
People from Pinetown
Zulu people
South African soccer players
Association football forwards
South Africa international soccer players
Platinum Stars F.C. players
SuperSport United F.C. players
Vasco da Gama (South Africa) players
Santos F.C. (South Africa) players
TS Sporting F.C. players
South African Premier Division players